Ghoria collitoides is a moth of the family Erebidae. It was described by Arthur Gardiner Butler in 1885. It is found in the Russian Far East (Amur, Primorye, Sakhalin, Kunashir), China (Heilongjiang, Jilin, Shaanxi, Sichuan, Yunan), Korea and Japan.

References

Moths described in 1885
Lithosiina
Moths of Asia